New Zealand competed at the 2022 Winter Olympics in Beijing, China, from 4 to 20 February 2022. The New Zealand team consisted of 15 athletes—nine men and six women—who competed in five sports. Selection of the New Zealand team was the responsibility of the New Zealand Olympic Committee (NZOC).

Alice Robinson and Finn Bilous were the country's flagbearers for the opening ceremony.  Nico Porteous was the New Zealand flagbearer at the closing ceremony.

Zoi Sadowski-Synnott became New Zealand's first Winter Olympics gold medallist when she won the women's snowboarding slopestyle. Sadowski-Synnott also won a silver medal, in the women's snowboarding big air. Later in the Games, Nico Porteous won the gold medal in the men's freestyle skiing halfpipe, to become the first New Zealand man and youngest New Zealander to win a Winter Olympics gold medal.  With two gold medals and one silver medal, placing New Zealand 17th on the medal table, the 2022 Winter Olympics were the country's most successful since first competing at the Winter Games in 1952.

Medallists

Competitors
The following table lists of number of New Zealand competitors who participated at the Games by gender and sport.

Alpine skiing

New Zealand qualified one male and three female alpine skiers but chose to only use one female quota.

The NZOC announced the first alpine skier on 19 September 2021.

Sources:

Biathlon

New Zealand qualified one male athlete.

Sources:

Cross-country skiing

By meeting the basic qualification standards New Zealand qualified one male cross-country skier, but rejected their quota.

Freestyle skiing 
The NZOC announced the first three freestyle skiers on 19 September 2021, adding six more on 20 January 2022.

Sources:

Snowboarding 

The NZOC announced the first snowboarder on 19 September 2021, adding two more snowboarders on 20 January 2022.

Sources:

Speed skating

The NZOC announced the first speed skater on 19 January 2020.

Individual

Sources: 

Mass start

Sources:

References

Nations at the 2022 Winter Olympics
2022
Winter Olympics